The Sera is a small sports car built in France from 1959 to 1961. A few cars were also built in Spain.

Background
The name of the company that built the car was SERA SA, an acronym for "Société d'Études et de Réalisations Automobiles, Société Anonyme". This was not the SERA-CD company founded by Charles Deutsch, whose full company name was "Société d'Études et de Réalisations Automobiles - Charles Deutsch". The company that built the Sera was founded by M.G. Rey and was based in Porte de Villiers, Paris. Some references indicate that French industrialist François Arbel, who had been one of the principals behind the second iteration of the Symétric hybrid prototype, was involved in the project and was instrumental in bringing Jacques Durand in to do the design.

Features and specifications
Durand's design for the Sera was a stylish 2-seat convertible. A removable hardtop was optional. The Sera incorporated parts from other vehicles. The windshield, for instance, was from the Simca Aronde Océane, the taillights were from the Panhard PL 17 and the backlight in the removable hardtop was from the Citroën DS.

The engine drove the front-wheels through a 4-speed manual transaxle from the Panhard Dyna Z.

Production history
Five cars were built in preparation for the car's official unveiling at the 1959 Paris Auto Salon. SERA was unable to secure a stand at the show and so improvised a display of the car outside of the pavilion where the show was held. The car was priced at 14,000 francs. Eight more cars were built in a facility in the 17th arrondissement of Paris before production was moved to the former Motobloc factory in Bordeaux where 15 more cars were built before the factory shut down in January 1961.

One of the Bordeaux Seras was exhibited at a fair in Barcelona which elicited a proposal to build the car in Spain. This resulted in Durand relocating to Tarragona to restart Sera production there. Import restrictions imposed by the Franco government made it impossible to obtain the French Panhard components needed to complete the cars. One Spanish-built Sera was completed with a three-cylinder two-stroke DKW engine in a front-wheel drive layout and a second car was fitted with a Fiat engine in a front-engine, rear-wheel drive configuration before the endeavour collapsed.

A Sera fixed-head coupé has been displayed both prior to and following a full restoration. It is not known if this car is in its original configuration as the shape of the greenhouse is very reminiscent of the later Arista also designed by Durand.

References

Front-wheel-drive vehicles
Cars powered by boxer engines
Cars introduced in 1959
Defunct motor vehicle manufacturers of France
Automobiles with backbone chassis
Cars of France